The Crown & Thistle was a pub at 44 The Terrace, Gravesend, Kent, England.

It opened in 1849.

It was CAMRA's National Pub of the Year for 2003.

The pub has been closed since November 2015.

References

Pubs in Kent